Ellen Ugland (19 May 1953 in Grimstad – 6 December 2010 in Bærum) was a Norwegian billionaire

She was the widow of billionaire Johan Jørgen Ugland (1921-2010) who she had married on 15 May 1989. Her husband died on 28 March 2010. She was found dead in her apartment in Lysaker, Bærum on 6 December 2010. Shortly after her body was found the police announced the death to be suspicious.

See also
J. J. Ugland

References

External links
Ugland family tree

1953 births
2010 deaths
Norwegian businesspeople in shipping
Norwegian billionaires
21st-century Norwegian businesswomen
21st-century Norwegian businesspeople
People from Grimstad